Sicelle is a village in Tuscany, central Italy, located in the comune of Castellina in Chianti, province of Siena.

Bibliography 
 

Frazioni of Castellina in Chianti